Al-Hilal won the championship for the 6th time in 1990.

Newly promoted Al-Raed carried on the Saudi tradition by getting relegated in their first season along with Al-Nahda who were relegated for the first time since the 1977–78 season

Stadia and locations

Final league table

Al-Najma and Al-Arabi were promoted.

External links 
 RSSSF Stats
 Saudi Arabia Football Federation
 Saudi League Statistics

Saudi Premier League seasons
Saudi Professional League
Professional League